Thaumatopsis digrammellus is a moth in the family Crambidae. It was described by George Hampson in 1919. It is found in Mexico.

References

External links 
 "Thaumatopsis digrammellus". Animal Diversity Web. University of Michigan.

Crambini
Moths described in 1919
Moths of Central America